The Otome wa Boku ni Koishiteru animated television series is based on the visual novel Otome wa Boku ni Koishiteru by the Japanese software company Caramel Box. The episodes, produced by the animation studio Feel, are directed by Munenori Nawa, written by Katsumi Hasegawa, and features character design by Noriko Shimazawa who based the designs on Norita's original concept. The story follows the main character Mizuho Miyanokouji, a male high school student who transfers into an all-girls school, and how he lives his life interacting with many girls who do not know he is actually a boy.

Twelve episodes were produced by Feel and aired in Japan between October 6 and December 24, 2006 on several networks including TV Kanagawa and Chiba TV. The episodes were released on four DVD compilations released in limited and regular editions containing four episodes for the first DVD, and three for the subsequent releases. The limited releases were between January 11 and April 4, 2007, and the regular releases were between May 9 and August 8, 2007. A single original video animation episodes was released on the final limited edition DVD. The cover art from the limited edition DVDs features art from the original visual novel. Media Blasters released the series, including the OVA, as English-subtitled DVDs between June 24 and October 7, 2008 under the title Otoboku: Maidens Are Falling For Me!.

Two pieces of theme music are used for the episodes; one opening theme and one ending theme. The opening theme is "Love Power" by Aice5, and the ending theme is "Beautiful Day" by Yui Sakakibara. The insert song "Again" by Sakakibara was used in episode eleven.

Anime television series

OVA

See also

List of anime based on video games

References

External links
Anime official website 

Otome wa Boku ni Koishiteru
Episodes